Franz Theodor Doflein (5 April 1873, in Paris – 24 August 1924, in Obernigk, near today's Wrocław) was a German zoologist known for his studies of animal ecology.

Biography 
He studied medicine and zoology at the University of Munich, where he was influenced by Richard Hertwig. In 1895–96 he worked as an auxiliary assistant to Alexander Götte at the University of Strasbourg, followed by research of fish diseases at Munich as an assistant under Bruno Hofer. In 1898, on behalf of the Bavarian Academy of Sciences, he took part in a study trip to the West Indies, Mexico and California. After his return to Germany, he served as an assistant at the Zoologischen Staatssammlung (Zoological State Collections) in Munich.

In 1904–05 he conducted zoological research in Japan and Ceylon. In 1907 he became an associate professor of zoological systematics and biology in Munich, and three years later, was named second director of the Zoologischen Staatssammlung. In 1912 he succeeded August Weismann as chair of zoology at the University of Freiburg, and following a research trip to Macedonia, he obtained a professorship at the University of Breslau (1918).

His name is associated with Doflein's salamander, Bolitoglossa dofleini, circumscribed by Franz Werner in 1903. The sea anemone genus Dofleinia also bears his name, as do taxa with the specific epithet of dofleini, an example being Enteroctopus dofleini (Giant Pacific octopus).

Next to his scientific work, Doflein practiced painting and wrote novellas.

Published works 

He was the author of a well-received textbook on protozoans, titled Lehrbuch der Protozoenkunde. It was published over several editions; its fifth edition (1927–29) being issued by Eduard Reichenow. He was also the author of significant works associated with termites, crustaceans, ants and ant lions.
 Die Protozoen als Parasiten und Krankheitserreger nach biologischen Gesichtspunkten dargestellt, 1901 – The protozoan as parasite and pathogen, etc.
 Die Pilzkulturen der Termiten, 1905 – The fungal cultures of termites
 Mitteilungen über japanische Crustaceen, 1906 – On Japanese crustaceans
 Tierbau und Tierleben in ihrem Zusammenhang betrachtet; 2 volumes, 1910, 1914 (with Richard Hesse)
 Lehrbuch der Protozoenkunde; eine Darstellung der Naturgeschichte der Protozoen, 1909 – Textbook of protozoan studies: a representation involving the natural history of the protozoa.
 Probleme der Protistenkunde, 1909 – Problems associated with protist studies.
 Lebensgewohnheiten und Anpassungen bei dekapoden Krebsen, 1910 – Behavior and adaptation of decapod crabs. 
 Beiträge zur Naturgeschichte Ostasiens, 1911 (editor) – Contributions ro East Asian natural history.
 Der Ameisenlöwe: Eine biologische, tierpsychologische und reflexbiologische Untersuchung, 1916 – The ant lion, analysis of its biology, animal psychology and reflex biology.
 Mazedonische ameisen. Beobachtungen über ihre Lebensweise, 1920 – Macedonian ants; observations of its behavior.

References 

1873 births
1924 deaths
Academic staff of the University of Breslau
Academic staff of the Ludwig Maximilian University of Munich
Ludwig Maximilian University of Munich alumni
University of Strasbourg alumni
Academic staff of the University of Freiburg
German microbiologists
20th-century German zoologists
Emigrants from France to the German Empire